
Wolsztyn County is a unit of territorial administration and local government (powiat) in Greater Poland Voivodeship, west-central Poland. It came into being on January 1, 1999, as a result of the Polish local government reforms passed in 1998.

As of 2006 its total population is 54,718, out of which the population of Wolsztyn is 13,557 and the rural population is 41,161.

Neighbouring counties
Wolsztyn County is bordered by Nowy Tomyśl County to the north, Grodzisk Wielkopolski County to the north-east, Kościan County to the east, Leszno County to the south-east, Wschowa County to the south, Nowa Sól County to the south-west and Zielona Góra County to the west.

Administrative division
The county is subdivided into three gminas (one urban-rural and two rural). These are listed in the following table, in descending order of population.

References
Polish official population figures 2006

 
Wolsztyn